Sir Ivan Roy Callan, KCVO, CMG (born 1942) is a retired British diplomat.

Educated at University College, Oxford, Callan joined the Foreign and Commonwealth Office (FCO) in 1969 and was appointed to HM Diplomatic Service in 1972. He was appointed Consul-General at the British Embassy in Baghdad in 1983 and then moved to Jerusalem where he was Consul-General from 1987 to 1990. After returning to the FCO, he was appointed High Commissioner of Brunei (1994–98) and then Ambassador to Oman, serving from 1999 until retirement in 2002.

Callan was appointed a Companion of the Order of St Michael and St George in the 1990 Birthday Honours. He was also appointed a Knight Commander of the Royal Victorian Order in September 1998.

References 

Living people
1942 births
British diplomats
Alumni of University College, Oxford
Knights Commander of the Royal Victorian Order
Companions of the Order of St Michael and St George